Marvin Braude Mulholland Gateway Park is a  park in the Santa Monica Mountains, with its trailhead at the southern terminus of Reseda Boulevard in Tarzana, Los Angeles, California. The park was named for former Los Angeles City Councilman Marvin Braude, who for more than 30 years led the effort to preserve the Santa Monica Mountains. Owned by the Santa Monica Mountains Conservancy, the park is within the Santa Monica Mountains National Recreation Area.

Marvin Braude Mulholland Gateway Park is in the California coastal sage and chaparral and the California chaparral and woodlands ecoregions.

Trails
Braude Park connects with  Topanga State Park and the  "Big Wild" to create a large expanse of undeveloped wild land offering hiking, mountain biking and equestrian trails.

On the ridgetop is the unpaved section of Mulholland Drive, closed to cars, for hiking and vistas north over the Valley and south over the Los Angeles Basin to the Pacific Ocean.

The park trails also connects with the Backbone Trail System that runs along the length of the range.

Braude Park is also the unofficial trail head for the Lemming Trail, a  one-way hike over the mountains from the valley to the sea. Lemming Trail offers a grand tour of the Santa Monica Mountains, from Tarzana to Topanga to Temescal to the Pacific.

Access

See also
Santa Monica Mountains National Recreation Area
Flora of the Santa Monica Mountains
Santa Monica Mountains index
California chaparral and woodlands topics

References

External links
 LA Mountains.com: Marvin Braude Mulholland Gateway Park
 HIKING: SANTA MONICA MOUNTAINS; Valley Gateway to Trails Lets Walkers Leave the Suburban World Behind

Mulholland
Parks in the San Fernando Valley
Parks in Los Angeles
Parks in Los Angeles County, California
Regional parks in California
Tarzana, Los Angeles